J. William Langston is the Founder and Chief Scientific Officer, Movement Disorder Specialist, and Chief Executive Officer of the Parkinson's Institute and Clinical Center in Sunnyvale, California,  the founding member of the Scientific Advisory Board for the Michael J Fox Foundation and the Co-Editor-in-Chief of the Journal of Parkinson’s Disease.  He is a graduate of the University of Missouri School of Medicine. Langston was formerly a faculty member at Stanford University and Chairman of Neurology at Santa Clara Valley Medical Center in San Jose, California. Langston has authored or co-authored some 360 peer-reviewed articles in the field of neurology, most of which are on Parkinson's disease and related disorders. Langston gained national and international recognition in 1982 for the discovery of the link between a "synthetic heroin" contaminant (MPTP) and parkinsonism.

Career 
In 1982 William Langston was head of neurology at Santa Clara Valley Medical Center when he made a major breakthrough in the research of Parkinson's Disease as a result of several incidents detailed in the book The Case of the Frozen Addicts.
Langston continued research into Parkinson's Disease and became an internationally known neuroscientist. He opened the Parkinson's Institute and Clinical Center in Sunnyvale, California in 1988 and became the Chief Executive Officer and Scientific Director. Langston's current research interests include the study of mechanisms of neuronal degeneration, the etiology of Parkinson's disease, and the development of new strategies to slow or halt disease progression such as cell replacement therapy and gene therapy and, more recently, the possible environmental causes of Parkinson's disease such as pesticides, cluster cases and the early identification of sufferers through genome mapping.  In 2014 Carrolee Barlow became Chief Executive Officer of the Institute with Langston continuing as Chief Scientific Officer.

During an interview in 2009 Langston stated: "I would never promise I could solve the disease. What I would do is say, I think there's a very real possibility, with the adequate funding, that we could make major progress on both finding the cause of the disease, which could lead to prevention, and also major progress on finding ways to slow and halt disease progression. I think that's a realistic possibility in my lifetime, my career. I wouldn't have said that five or 10 years ago. A cure, I will not say."

The Case of the Frozen Addicts 

The Case of the Frozen Addicts. was written by Langston and Jon Palfreman in 1995. A later edition was published in 2014. The book details the work done by Langston, his colleagues and associates around the world to isolate the neurotoxic contaminant which caused the Parkinson's like symptoms in a number of heroin users and to develop methods of utilising this discovery. The book includes discovery of the dangers to researchers in handling the contaminant and some competition and contention between researchers.

William Langston was head of neurology at Santa Clara Valley Medical Center in 1982 when a drug offender was admitted who could neither move or talk. He had been admitted from the county jail and initially treated as a malingerer but later admitted to the psychiatric unit with suspected catatonic schizophrenia. During an examination of the patient, Langston noticed his fingers moving, perhaps voluntarily, and wrapped them around a pencil. The patient began to write notes that indicated that his mind was normal but his body was not responding. He had taken heroin before the symptoms developed. Through coincidental personal connections and media presentations another 5 patients suffering the same symptoms were discovered. All had what appeared to be symptoms of advanced Parkinson's Disease. In an attempt to save their lives Dr Langston administered L-dopa, a drug then recently introduced to treat Parkinson's Disease. The patients responded and could move and talk. (Unfortunately all six patients later developed severe side effects.)

The common link between the patients was the batch of heroin they had taken. Medical and police research established that the batch of synthetic heroin all six patients had used contained a neurotoxic contaminant, MPTP. MPTP (which sometimes taints MPPP, an effective synthetic opioid), is selectively toxic to the same nerve cells in the brain which die in Parkinson's disease, the substantia nigra. The discovery of the biologic effects of this compound led to a renaissance of the basic and clinical research in Parkinson's disease.

The clinical implications of this case were ground breaking. Parkinson's Disease is only suffered by humans but animal testing is essential in drug development. Now Parkinson's Disease symptoms could be induced in monkeys by using MPTP and research could begin into drugs to treat the disease. "[W]hat had started as a drug tragedy was to open a new chapter of medical research which would offer hope to Parkinson's disease sufferers throughout the world."

Awards 
Langston has received numerous awards, including the Distinguished Achievement Award from Modern Medicine, the Sarah M. Poiley Award from the New York Academy of Sciences, the 30th Anniversary Award from the Parkinson's Disease Foundation in 1987, the Distinguished Clinical Investigator Award from Roche Pharmaceuticals, the 1999 Movement Disorders Research Award from the American Academy of Neurology, the 2008 Donald Calne Lectureship and 2012 Robert A. Pritzker Prize for Leadership in Parkinson’s Research from The Michael J. Fox Foundation for Parkinson’s Research.

Selected publications

References

External links
 Parkinson's Institute homepage

Year of birth missing (living people)
Living people
American neurologists
University of Missouri alumni
American neuroscientists
American medical researchers
Stanford University School of Medicine faculty
Parkinson's disease researchers